The 11th British Empire Trophy was a Formula One motor race held on 26 May 1950 at the Douglas Circuit, in Douglas, Isle of Man. The 36-lap race was won by ERA driver Bob Gerard. John Horsfall finished second in another ERA, and Fred Ashmore was third in a Maserati.

Results

References

External links

British Empire Trophy
British Empire Trophy
Brit
1949 in the Isle of Man